Lagarrigue may refer to the following places in France:

 Lagarrigue, Lot-et-Garonne, a commune in the Lot-et-Garonne department
 Lagarrigue, Tarn, a commune in the Tarn department